Courtney Keith "Bingo" Allen (August 21, 1923 – February 4, 2014) was a Canadian professional ice hockey defenceman and National Hockey League (NHL) head coach and general manager. He played 28 games in the NHL for the Detroit Red Wings during the 1953–54 and 1954–55 seasons. The rest of his career, which lasted from 1941 to 1957, was spent in various minor leagues. 

After his playing career, he turned to coaching and managing, first in the minor Western Hockey League before returning to the NHL in 1967 as the first coach and general manager of the Philadelphia Flyers. He coach the Flyers from 1967 to 1969, staying as manager until 1983. He was the executive vice-president of the Philadelphia Flyers, a position he held from 1980 for the rest of his life.

Playing career
Allen played junior hockey for the Saskatoon Quakers in 1940–41, and then joined the Washington Eagles of the Eastern Amateur Hockey League for the 1941–42 season, followed by a year with the Buffalo Bisons of the American Hockey League. During the Second World War, he played on the Saskatoon Navy hockey team, and then played the 1945–46 season in the Western Canada Senior Hockey League with the Saskatoon Elks.

In 1946, Allen joined the Springfield Indians of the American Hockey League, for whom he played the next five seasons. The Indians moved to Syracuse in 1951, becoming the Warriors, and he was a steady presence in the line-up for the next two and a half seasons. In February 1954, Warriors owner Eddie Shore tried to assign Allen to the Springfield Indians of the Quebec Hockey League, but he (along with several other players) balked and he was suspended. He was sold to the Detroit Red Wings two weeks later. He played 10 games with Detroit in the 1953–54 season and appeared in the playoffs, getting his name engraved on the Stanley Cup. Allen played another 18 games for the Red Wings in 1954–55, which would be the end of his NHL playing career.

He spent most of the 1954–55 season in the Western Hockey League with the Edmonton Flyers—Detroit's farm team, whose roster included future Hockey Hall of Fame inductees Johnny Bucyk, Norm Ullman, Glenn Hall, Al Arbour, and player-coach Bud Poile. He then played one season with the Brandon Regals before being hired by the Seattle Americans as player-head coach in 1956. He retired as a player in 1957 to become a full-time coach.

Coaching/management career
From 1956 to 1965, Allen was a head coach in the Western Hockey League with the Seattle Americans/Seattle Totems, with only one losing season in eight years. With the NHL expansion in 1967, Allen was hired as the first head coach of the Philadelphia Flyers, with his former coach and teammate Bud Poile as general manager. In their inaugural season, the Flyers finished first in their division with the best record among the six new teams. They fell to third place in their division in the 1968–69 NHL season, and Allen then became the Flyers' general manager while serving in the same capacity with the Quebec Aces at the same time. There, he would help construct the famed "Broad Street Bullies" that led the Flyers to consecutive Stanley Cups in 1974 and 1975.  He would also help start the AHL's Maine Mariners, one of the most successful franchises in that league's history.

Allen was elected to the Hockey Hall of Fame as a Builder in 1992. He was the executive vice-president of the Flyers.

Life
He was born in Saskatoon, Saskatchewan.

Allen was married to Joyce Webster for 65 years. Together they had a daughter, Traci, and two sons, Brad and Blake. Relocating from Seattle in the 1960s, he and his wife Joyce settled in Bryn Mawr, Pennsylvania.

Due to developing dementia in his later years, Allen lived in the care of an assisted living community, along with wife Joyce, in Newtown Square, Pennsylvania. He died on February 4, 2014. He was 90-years-old.

Career statistics

Regular season and playoffs

Coaching record

See also
 List of NHL head coaches

References

External links
 

1923 births
2014 deaths
Buffalo Bisons (AHL) players
Canadian ice hockey coaches
Canadian ice hockey defencemen
Detroit Red Wings players
Edmonton Flyers (WHL) players
Hockey Hall of Fame inductees
Ice hockey people from Saskatchewan
Ice hockey player-coaches
Lester Patrick Trophy recipients
Maine Mariners
National Hockey League executives
Philadelphia Flyers coaches
Philadelphia Flyers executives
Royal Canadian Navy personnel of World War II
Seattle Americans players
Sportspeople from Saskatoon
Springfield Indians players
Stanley Cup champions
Syracuse Warriors players